Felix Emmanuel Cédric Chenkam Nganle (born 28 December 1998), commonly known as Felix Chenkam, is a Cameroonian footballer who plays as a forward for Salerm Puente Genil.

Club career
Chenkam began his career in Cameroon, playing with Union Douala and Rainbow Bamenda, before signing with Seattle Sounders FC 2 in the United Soccer League in March 2017.

Chenkam made his Sounders 2 debut on 26 March 2017, coming on as a substitute in the 73rd minute of the season opening 2–1 loss to Sacramento. Chenkam's first start and first goal with S2 both came on 15 April 2017 in a 2–1 win over Los Angeles.

Chenkam's contract option was declined by Seattle on 19 November 2018. In October 2019, Chenkam returned to Union Douala.

International career
Chenkam was selected to represent the Cameroon U20s at the 2017 Africa U-20 Cup of Nations in Zambia after helping them qualify by scoring a goal in a 3–0 win over Libya on 10 July 2016.  Chenkam made 3 substitute appearances at the tournament, as Cameroon was knocked out of the tournament at the group stage.

Career statistics

Stats accurate

References

External links 

Sounders player profile
Confederation of African Football profile
 

1998 births
Living people
Cameroonian footballers
Cameroon youth international footballers
Cameroonian expatriate footballers
Union Douala players
Rainbow FC (Cameroon) players
Tacoma Defiance players
Seattle Sounders FC players
Association football forwards
Expatriate soccer players in the United States